Begegnungen (German for "meetings" or "encounters") is a Sky Records 1984 collection of music by Brian Eno, Dieter Moebius, Hans-Joachim Roedelius and Conny Plank, compiled from these seven solo and collaborative albums released by Sky between 1976 and 1983:

 Durch die Wüste (Roedelius' first solo album)
 Rastakraut Pasta (Moebius and Plank)
 After the Heat (Eno, Moebius and Roedelius)
 Tonspuren (Moebius' first solo album)
 Zero Set  (Moebius, Plank, Neumeier)
 Sowiesoso (Cluster)
 The eponymous Cluster & Eno

A second volume, Begegnungen II, was also released.

Begegnungen was issued on CD in the US in 1996 by the Gyroscope label . It was also reissued on Pat Thomas's San Francisco-based Water label in 2006.

Tracks

"Johanneslust" (Roedelius) – 4:58 (from Durch die Wüste)
"Two Oldtimers" (Moebius & Plank) – 6:58 (from Rastakraut Pasta)
"The Belldog" (Eno-Moebius-Roedelius) – 6:14 (from After the Heat)
"Nervös" (Dieter Moebius) – 3:26 (from Tonspuren)
"Pitch Control" (Moebius-Plank-Neumeier) – 6:21 (from Zero Set)
"Dem Wanderer" (Cluster) – 3:52 (from Sowiesoso)
"Schöne Hände" (Cluster & Eno) – 3:02 (from Cluster & Eno)

References

External links
Ross Smith, David [ Allmusic review] Retrieved September 11, 2007.

1984 compilation albums
Cluster (band) albums
Brian Eno compilation albums
Moebius & Plank albums
Hans-Joachim Roedelius albums